Carl Adams (born August 3, 1942) is a former NASCAR driver from National City, California. He made 28 Cup Series starts in his career. He earned five top-ten finishes and had a best effort of 23rd in the point standings in 1975.

Adams began racing at Cajon Speedway near San Diego, California in 1962; eventually racing concurrently in both Super Stocks and the open wheel Modified Sportsman classes and winning feature events in both before moving into CRA Sprint Cars.

Additionally, Adams had great success racing Super Modifieds on a winter tour of ovals in South Africa. Adams won three CRA Sprint Car features before turning to the NASCAR Grand National West division in 1972.  He was named GNW rookie of the year for 1972. Adams competed on the GNW circuit in 1973 before heading off to the premier series in 1974 and 1975.

Racing career results

NASCAR Winston Cup Series

References 

Living people
1942 births
People from National City, California
Racing drivers from California
Racing drivers from San Diego
NASCAR drivers